Pterocryptis is a genus of sheatfish. These fish are medium-sized catfishes usually found in fast flowing mountain streams throughout India, southern China and Southeast Asia. There are two cavefish species in the genus, P. buccata and P. cucphuongensis.

Species
There are currently 17 recognized species in this genus:
Pterocryptis anomala (Herre, 1933)
Pterocryptis barakensis Vishwanath & Nebeshwar Sharma, 2006
Pterocryptis berdmorei (Blyth, 1860)
Pterocryptis bokorensis (Pellegrin & Chevey, 1937)
Pterocryptis buccata Ng & Kottelat, 1998 (Cave sheatfish)
Pterocryptis burmanensis (Thant, 1966)
Pterocryptis cochinchinensis (Valenciennes, 1840)
Pterocryptis crenula Ng & Freyhof, 2001
Pterocryptis cucphuongensis (Mai, 1978)
Pterocryptis furnessi (Fowler, 1905)
Pterocryptis gangelica Peters, 1861
Pterocryptis indicus (Datta, Barman & Jayaram, 1987)
Pterocryptis inusitata Ng, 1999
Pterocryptis taytayensis (Herre, 1924)
Pterocryptis torrentis (Kobayakawa, 1989)
Pterocryptis verecunda Ng & Freyhof, 2001
Pterocryptis wynaadensis (Day, 1873)

References

Siluridae
Fish of Southeast Asia
Freshwater fish genera
Catfish genera
Taxa named by Wilhelm Peters